José Carlos Costa Semedo (born 15 July 1992), known as Zé Carlos Semedo, is a footballer who plays as a forward for Loures. Born in Portugal, he represents the São Tomé and Príncipe national team.

International career
Semedo made his professional debut with the São Tomé and Príncipe national team in a 2–0 2021 Africa Cup of Nations qualification loss to Sudan on 24 March 2021.

References

External links
 
 
 

1992 births
Living people
Footballers from Lisbon
People with acquired São Tomé and Príncipe citizenship
São Tomé and Príncipe footballers
São Tomé and Príncipe international footballers
Portuguese footballers
Portuguese people of São Tomé and Príncipe descent
Association football forwards
Campeonato de Portugal (league) players